Meleh-ye Balut (also Romanized as Meleh-ye Balūţ; also known as Morād ʿAlī) is a village in Dowreh Rural District, Chegeni District, Dowreh County, Lorestan Province, Iran. At the 2006 census, its population was 409, in 90 families.

References 

Towns and villages in Dowreh County